Faton Maloku (born 11 June 1991) is a Kosovoan professional footballer who plays as a goalkeeper for Kosovo club Drita.

Club career

Return to Feronikeli
On 30 December 2016, Maloku returned to his former club, Feronikeli and signed a 1,5 year contract.

Kukësi
On 5 June 2018, Maloku signed to Albanian Superliga side Kukësi and became the fifth goalkeeper at the club. On 16 August, he made his debut with Kukësi in the third qualifying round of 2018–19 UEFA Europa League against Georgian side Torpedo Kutaisi.

International career
On 8 November 2017, Maloku received a call-up from Kosovo for the friendly match against Latvia, he was an unused substitute in that match.

References

External links

1991 births
Living people
People from Gjilan
Kosovan footballers
Kosovan expatriate footballers
Expatriate footballers in Albania
Kosovan expatriate sportspeople in Albania
Association football goalkeepers
Football Superleague of Kosovo players
SC Gjilani players
KF Feronikeli players
KF Hajvalia players
FC Drita players
Kategoria Superiore players
FK Kukësi players